The Deonar abattoir is an abattoir (slaughterhouse) located in Deonar, in the eastern suburb of Mumbai, India. The abattoir used to be the largest in Asia in 1971.
People used to buy bull and others cattle from here but when Bharatiya Janata Party-Shivsena government came to power in Maharashtra they banned the slaughtering of bull.

References

Abattoirs in India
Companies based in Mumbai